Family Circus is a 2018 Gujarati musical comedy drama starring veteran Gujarati actor Monal Gajjar,  Raunaq Kamdar, Mitra Gadhavi. The film is directed by Viral Rao and set to release for 19 October 2018,  and produced by Alpesh Patel & Digesh Patel from Eva Entertainment LLP. Nationwide Release by Rupam Entertainment.

Plot 
Two best friends Ronak and JJ lead a middle-class lifestyle and dream of becoming rich. Things go south when they decide to take the help of an underworld don Altaf Anna to end their money troubles and to win the heart of a girl Riya.

Cast 
 Monal Gajjar as Riya
 Raunaq Kamdar as Ronak
 Mitra Gadhavi  as JJ
Smit Pandya as Altaf Anna
 Bharat Chawda as Aarav
Mehul Buch as Riya's father

Production

Development 
The film is produced Alpesh Patel & Digesh Patel from Eva EntertainmentLLP and set to release for this Dussehra

Soundtrack 
Hemang Dholakia composed the songs of the film and the lyrics are penned by Krupesh Thacker & Milind Gadhavi.

References 

2018 films
Films set in Ahmedabad
Films shot in Ahmedabad
Films shot in Gujarat
2010s Gujarati-language films